The 1922–23 British Home Championship was a football tournament played between the British Home Nations during the 1922–23 season. It was won by Scotland, the strongest of the Home Nations during the decade, who almost whitewashed the other three nations but ultimately were held to a 2–2 draw by England in the final, deciding match.

England and Scotland dominated the tournament, both winning their opening matches. England began six months earlier than their opponents, defeating Ireland at home in October 1922. Scotland matched this result in their opening game in March 1923 and continued with a second victory over Wales, against whom England only managed a draw in Cardiff. In the final matches, Scotland drew with England, doing just enough to take the title by a single point. Ireland, playing for pride comprehensively beat Wales in the last match of the competition to come third.

Table

Results

Winning squad

References

1922–23 in English football
1922–23 in Scottish football
Brit
1923 in British sport
1922-23
1922 in British sport
1922–23 in Northern Ireland association football